Autostrada A35 , also known by the initials BreBeMi from the initials of the three provinces of Brescia, Bergamo and Milan, is a motorway that connects the cities of Brescia and Milan with a route positioned further south than the route of the A4 motorway. The A35 is managed by the homonymous company Brebemi.

References

Buildings and structures completed in 2014
2014 establishments in Italy
A35
Transport in Lombardy